The Canadian Cycling Association (CCA), branded as Cycling Canada (CC) (French: Cyclisme Canada (CC)) is the national governing body of cycle racing in Canada.

Role
Cycling Canada is a National Sport Organization whose main reason for being is the organization and promotion of cycling in Canada.

Programs
Cycling Canada also operates CAN-BIKE, a nationally standardized series of courses on all aspects of cycling safely oriented toward recreational and utilitarian cycling.

Partnerships
Cycling Canada is a member of the UCI and COPACI.

Organization
Cycling Canada, previously the Association Cycliste Canadienne-Canadian Cycling Association (130177116rr0001) is registered with Canadian Revenue Agency as a Canadian amateur athletic association (RCAAA).

Provincial governing bodies

References

External links
 Cycling Canada's official website

National members of the Pan American Cycling Confederation
Cycle racing organizations
Cycle racing in Canada
Cycling
Cycling organizations in Canada
Sports organizations established in 1882